Wemmerpan Commando was a light infantry regiment of the South African Army. It formed part of the South African Army Infantry Formation as well as the South African Territorial Reserve.

History

Origin
Approval was granted on 3 July 1962 for the establishment of the Wemmerpan Commando.

Operations

With the SADF
On 1 March 1963, the unit was activated under the command of Capt E.W. Meerbacher. The unit owed its name to the fact that it was situated near Wemmer Pan, an old gold mine in the southern suburbs of Johannesburg. Initially the unit used the Rosettenville Central School grounds as its parade ground.

Headquarters
The first headquarters was situated in an old nursery school in Regents Park which was received from the City Council of Johannesburg.

The unit resorted under the command of Group 18.

Border Duty
The commando performed its first border duty in 1976 (October to December), the second in 1978 (January to March).

National Colours
On Tuesday 26 April 1994, Wemmerpan Commando laid up its National Colours at the South African National Museum of Military History. The laying up of National Colours followed a decision of the Defence Command Council that this should be done owing to the replacement of the National Flag by a new National Flag on 27 April 1994. The laying up of Colours is, in the life of any unit in possession of Colours, an occasion of supreme historical significance.

With the SANDF

Disbandment
This unit, along with all other Commando units was disbanded after a decision by South African President Thabo Mbeki to disband all Commando Units. The Commando system was phased out between 2003 and 2008 "because of the role it played in the apartheid era", according to the Minister of Safety and Security Charles Nqakula.

Unit Insignia

Leadership 
 Cmdt E.W. Meerbacher 1963-1964
 Cmdt N.L. Whitaker 1964-1969
 Maj J. Schragenheim 1969-1970
 Cmdt F.R Johnstone 1970-1980
 Cmdt M.K. Wood 1980-1983
 Cmdt A.A. van Heerden 1984-1987
 Cmdt L.J. Leonard 1988-

References

See also 
 South African Commando System

Infantry regiments of South Africa
South African Commando Units